The Venus effect is a phenomenon in the psychology of perception, named after various paintings of Venus gazing into a mirror, such as Diego Velázquez's Rokeby Venus, Titian's Venus with a Mirror, and Veronese's Venus with a Mirror. Viewers of such paintings have the impression that Venus is admiring her own reflection in the mirror. However the viewer sees the face of Venus in the mirror, and they are not directly behind her, therefore what Venus sees in the reflection cannot be the same as what the viewer sees. It would be more logical if the viewer were to conclude that Venus is looking at the reflection of the viewer, or in the case of the original setting, the reflection of the painter.

This line of research highlights that most people may hold beliefs that are inconsistent with observable phenomena. This field is known as naïve physics or intuitive physics.

This psychological effect is often used in the cinema, where an actor is shown apparently looking at themselves in the mirror. What viewers see is different from what the actor sees, because the camera is not right behind the actor, but the position of the actor is often chosen so that their image is nicely framed in the mirror for the camera.

Although the name of the effect refers to a woman, Venus, the effect is more general. The effect is seen with an animal apparently looking at itself in a mirror in The Lady and the Unicorn tapestries, where the unicorn appears to be gazing at its own reflection as it kneels on the ground.

Bertamini et al. (2010) conducted additional studies and confirmed that the Venus effect also occurs with photographs, and in real life when the person and the mirror are seen in a room.

Gallery

References

External links 
 News article about the research

Cinematic techniques
Artistic techniques
Mirrors
Perception